Jo Jae-Cheol (Hangul: 조재철; born 18 May 1986) is a South Korean football player who plays for Cheonan City FC.

Honors

Club
Seongnam Ilhwa Chunma
2010 AFC Champions League Winner
2011 FA Cup Winner

External links

1986 births
Living people
Association football midfielders
Association football forwards
South Korean footballers
Seongnam FC players
Gyeongnam FC players
Ansan Mugunghwa FC players
K League 1 players
K League 2 players
Sportspeople from Jeju Province
Ajou University alumni